Ed Tullett (born 20 October 1993), also known under his solo moniker Lowswimmer, is an English multi-instrumentalist, singer, songwriter and producer. His work includes collaborations with Novo Amor, and artist projects Hailaker, Lissom and Tolari.

History 
In October 2012 Tullett signed to Equal Vision Records. In the same month, Tullett's remix of Bon Iver's "Hinnom, TX" was released on Spotify. He then released an EP entitled Trawl through MTV Hype Music. Equal Vision Records followed this by digitally re-releasing a remastered version of the previously self-released Never Joy in December 2012. Another single, "Oxblood", was released on Equal Vision Records in April 2013.

Tullett began collaborating with Welsh Indie-Folk artist Novo Amor with their first collaborative single "Faux", which was released 23 June 2014 on Dumont Dumont & Brilliance Records.

"Alps", Tullett's second collaborative single with Novo Amor, was released 15 April 2016.

Heiress, Tullett and Novo Amor's full collaborative album, was released 10 November 2017 on All Points.

Tullett continues to collaborate with Novo Amor, co-writing both 2018's Birthplace and 2020's Cannot Be, Whatsoever, the artist's two albums to date, as well as being a touring member of the live band. His contribution was documented in the album documentary "Please Don't Stand Up When Room Is In Motion".

In August 2018, Tullett formed collaborative project Lissom with French pianist Julien Marchal. The duo has since released two records, 2018's Lissom, and 2022's Eclipses (Naïve Records).

Since 2019, Tullett has been working with Jemima Coulter on their collaborative project Hailaker. Their first self-titled record was released in April 2019. A second record, Holding, followed in April 2020. "Wavepool", a collaborative single featuring S. Carey of Bon Iver was released in May 2021.

In 2020, Tullett formed Tolari, an instrumental electronic project with longtime friend Auryn Tate (Shinamo Moki). The pair released their debut album Leylines in 2022 (Nettwerk).

In June 2022, Tullett began releasing solo material again, under his new artist moniker Lowswimmer. Twinned albums Glasshouse 1 + 2 were released in June and July respectively.

Discography 
Lowswimmer

 Glasshouse 1 (Lowswimmer Records, 2022)
 Glasshouse 2 (Lowswimmer Records, 2022)

Hailaker

 Hailaker (Lowswimmer Records, 2018)
 Holding (Lowswimmer Records, 2019)
 Wavepool ft. S. Carey (Single, Lowswimmer Records, 2021)

Novo Amor & Ed Tullett
 Faux (Single, Dumont Dumont / Brilliance Records, 2014) (with Novo Amor as Novo Amor & Ed Tullett)
 Alps (Single, Lacey Music, 2016) (with Novo Amor as Novo Amor & Ed Tullett)
 Heiress (All Points, 2017) (with Novo Amor as Novo Amor & Ed Tullett)
Lissom

 Lissom (Whales Records, 2018)
 Eclipses (Naïve Records, 2022)

Tolari
 Leylines (Nettwerk, 2022)

References

External links 
 Official Website
 Lowswimmer Website
 Lowswimmer on Instagram

1993 births
Living people
Equal Vision Records artists